Andrée Jonquoy known under the pseudonym Françoise Bernard, (2 March 1921 – 19 September 2021) was a French food writer and television presenter.

Life and career
Bernard was born in Paris, the daughter of a dyer. She began working as a typist at the age of 17, after the war, and was employed by Unilever in 1946. 

One day, the company's communication department asked her to play the role of a culinary consultant. The character Françoise Bernard was invented in 1953 by concatenation of the two most common first names of the 1950s, for public speaking and radio. Françoise extols the benefits of Astra margarine (owned by Unilever), using recipes she presents with the help of recipes that she presents. From 1960 onwards, she also promoted the benefits of the brand's materials Groupe SEB, which earned him the nickname of "Madame Cocotte-minute". She received more than a thousand letters a month from her listeners. She then worked on RTL. In 1963, she wrote a recipe book that competed with Ginette Mathiot's. In these Trente Glorieuses, she symbolizes the modern housewife, cooking faster and cheaper.

Her book Les Recettes faciles has sold over 1 million copies.

Publications 
 Les Recettes faciles, Hachette, 1965 , reprinted several times
 La Cuisine à l'électricité with 150 recipes by Françoise Bernard, Hachette, 1967
 Le Livre d'Or, Hachette 1985 
 Les recettes faciles de pâtisserie, Hachette, 1982
 La Bonne Cuisine de Catherine Vialard, Françoise Bernard et Alain Ducasse, 2002
 Nouvelles recettes faciles, 2004, 2008
 Menus et recettes pour toute la famille, 2004
 Cuisine express, 2007
 Les Basiques, Hachette pratique, 2007 
 Cuisine : 1000 recettes, Hachette pratique, 2008 
 Le Meilleur des desserts de Françoise Bernard et Sébastien Gaudard, 2009
 Ma cuisine d'aujourd'hui, 2010

References

Publishing
 .
 .
 

1921 births
2021 deaths
French food writers
Pseudonyms
French centenarians
Women centenarians
Writers from Paris
20th-century pseudonymous writers
Pseudonymous women writers